Pheidole lanuginosa is a species of ant in the subfamily Myrmicinae. It is endemic to India.

References

lanuginosa
Hymenoptera of Asia
Insects of India
Endemic fauna of India
Insects described in 1984
Taxonomy articles created by Polbot
Taxa named by E. O. Wilson